Vitus is a drama film written and directed by Fredi M. Murer. It was released on 2 February 2006 in Switzerland. It stars real-life piano prodigy Teo Gheorghiu, Bruno Ganz, Julika Jenkins, and Urs Jucker.

Plot 
Vitus, played by Teo Gheorghiu, is a highly gifted pianist at the age of 12. His parents mean well, but are over-protective, so Vitus rebels and seeks refuge with his grandfather (Bruno Ganz), who loves flying. After faking a head injury, Vitus secretly amasses a fortune on the stock market. The money allows his grandfather to purchase a Pilatus PC-6 and his father to return triumphantly to the company that fired him. Vitus pursues his former babysitter, Isabel, but she prefers someone older and does not return his affections.

Vitus returns to his piano and performs Robert Schumann's Piano Concerto on stage with the Zurich Chamber Orchestra.

Reception

Critical response 
Western critics gave Vitus generally favorable reviews. Review aggregation website Rotten Tomatoes gives the film a 64% rating, based on reviews from 58 critics. Metacritic rated the film 63 out of 100, based on 19 reviews.

Awards 

 Best Swiss Film of 2006 (Swiss Film Awards)

References

External links 
 
 Official trailer at Apple.com
 
 Vitus at the Swiss Film Directory
 
 
 
 

2006 films
2000s coming-of-age drama films
Sony Pictures Classics films
Films about pianos and pianists
Films shot in Zürich
Swiss German-language films
Swiss coming-of-age films
Swiss drama films
2006 drama films